Scott A. Fankhouser (born July 1, 1975) is an American former professional ice hockey goaltender. He played 23 games in the National Hockey League (NHL) with the Atlanta Thrashers between 1999 and 2001. The rest of his career, which lasted from 1999 to 2009, was spent in various minor leagues and with teams in Europe. After retiring from playing he served as an Assistant Coach for the Cincinnati Cyclones of the ECHL, and coached the Evansville Thunderbolts of the North American 3 Hockey League for a single season. He is currently the assistant manager of Swonder Ice Arena in Evansville Indiana.

Playing career
Fankhouser began his career playing at NCAA level with the University of Massachusetts Lowell.  He was employed mainly as a back-up goaltender in his first three years, managing just 38 appearances in three terms.  In his final year at the university however, he stepped up to become first choice, and over 32 games kept his goals against average down to 2.78.

At the end of his university career, Fankhouser was drafted by the St. Louis Blues of the NHL and was initially sent to play for the Greenville Grrrowl in South Carolina at ECHL level, but during the season would also feature in two more leagues, the AHL and the IHL for the Louisville Panthers and the Orlando Solar Bears respectively.  During this period, Fankhouser had also moved from being under contract to the Blues to sign for the Atlanta Thrashers, and would go on to make his NHL debut for his new team featuring in 16 top-level games.

The following season, Fankhouser would again play for the Thrashers several times, as well as a second spell at their IHL affiliate, the Solar Bears.  Unfortunately for Fankhouser, these appearances would prove to be his last in the NHL to date.  In the 2001/02 term, he would make another return journey, this time back to Greenville to play for the Grrrowl again.  Fankhouser also enjoyed short spells with the Hershey Bears and the Chicago Wolves.

During the off-season, Fankhouser was again on the move, signing for the Reading Royals of the ECHL, but again did not complete a full season for one team, splitting his time with 19 games for the Arkansas RiverBlades.  In 2003/04, Fankhouser would manage his first full season playing for one team since his university days, playing over 30 games in Germany for Bietigheim-Bissingen SC in the Second Bundesliga.

In 2004/05, Fankhouser returned to North America, again splitting his season, this time between the Toledo Storm and a short second spell back in Chicago.  Fankhouser switched back to Europe again the season after, this time playing in the Austrian league for the Graz 99ers as their number one goaltender.  He would remain in Austria the following season, but this time playing for the Vienna Capitals.

During the summer of 2005, Fankhouser again chose to remain playing in Europe, this time for the Manchester Phoenix in the EIHL, the top level of ice hockey in Britain.  During his time at the Phoenix, Fankhouser established himself as the first choice goaltender and started the season well, winning the EIHL 'Player of the Week' award early in the term.  Unfortunately this form did not last and Fankhouser was part of a notably leaky Manchester defence, regularly conceding more than five goals.  He was released by the Phoenix following their exit from the first round of the post-season.

Fankhouser returned to North America and, along with Phoenix teammate Jeff MacMillan signed for the Bloomington Prairie Thunder, a team icing in the United Hockey League. He was called up by the Milwaukee Admirals of the American Hockey League in January 2009 for a brief stint, but was soon returned to the UHL.

Career statistics

Regular season and playoffs

External links

1975 births
American men's ice hockey goaltenders
Arkansas RiverBlades players
Atlanta Thrashers players
Bloomington PrairieThunder players
Chicago Wolves players
Greenville Grrrowl players
Hershey Bears players
Ice hockey people from North Dakota
Living people
Louisville Panthers players
Manchester Phoenix players
Milwaukee Admirals players
Orlando Solar Bears (IHL) players
Reading Royals players
St. Louis Blues draft picks
Sportspeople from Bismarck, North Dakota
Toledo Storm players
UMass Lowell River Hawks men's ice hockey players
Loomis Chaffee School alumni
SC Bietigheim-Bissingen players
American expatriate ice hockey players in Canada
American expatriate ice hockey players in Germany
American expatriate ice hockey players in Austria
American expatriate ice hockey players in England
Vienna Capitals players
Graz 99ers players
American ice hockey coaches